Kirill Shubin (born 2 April 2003) is a Russian chess International Master (2019).

Biography
Kirill Shubin started playing chess at the age of six. He was a Vladivostok chess school student, but in 2015 moved to life in Saint Petersburg.

In 2014 he won the Vladivostok City Chess Open Championship. In 2015, he won the Saint Petersburg City Chess and Rapid Chess Championships in the U15 age group, but in Saint Petersburg City Blitz Chess Championship the U15 age group was second.

Kirill Shubin repeatedly represented Russia at the European Youth Chess Championships and World Youth Chess Championships in different age groups, where he won gold medal in 2015 in Poreč at the European Youth Chess Championship in the U12 age group. In 2014, he won World Schools Rapid Chess Championship in the U11 age group.

In 2019, Kirill Shubin receive FIDE International Master (IM) title.

References

External links

Kirill Shubin chess games at 365Chess.com

2003 births
Living people
Russian chess players
Chess International Masters